This article is a list of Slovenian artists and architects

A 
France Ahčin (1919-1989) - sculptor
Zvest Apollonio (1935–2009) - painter and graphic artist
Anton Ažbe (1862–1905) - painter

C 
Jože Ciuha (1924–2015) - painter, graphic artist and illustrator

Č 
Anton Čebej (1722–1774) - painter
Avgust Černigoj (1898–1985) - painter

D 
Julia Doria - illustrator, painter, writer

F 
Max Fabiani (1865–1962) - architect

G 
Ivan Grohar (1867–1911) - painter. 
Herman Gvardjančič (b. 1943) - painter.

J 
Stane Jagodič (b. 1943) - painter, graphic artist, montager and illustrator
Božidar Jakac (1899–1989) - painter, graphic artist and illustrator
Rihard Jakopič (1869–1943) - painter
Matija Jama (1872–1947) - painter

K 
Boris Kobe (1905–1981) - architect and painter
Ivana Kobilca (1861–1926) - painter
Tone Kralj (1900–1975) - painter
Juta Krulc (1913–2015) - landscape architect and artist

L  
Lojze Logar (1944–2014) - painter and graphic artist

M 
Adriana Maraž (1931–2015) - painter and graphic artist
France Mihelič (1907–1998) - painter and graphic artist
Pino Mlakar (1907–2006) - ballet dancer and choreographer
Marko Modic (b. 1958) - photographer, painter and visual artist
Miki Muster (1925–2018) - illustrator
Marko Mušič (b. 1941) - architect
Zoran Mušič (1909–2005) - painter

P 
Slavko Pengov (1908–1966) - painter
Veno Pilon (1896–1970) - painter
Štefan Planinc (b. 1925) - painter, graphic artist and illustrator
Jože Plečnik (1872–1957) - architect
Marjetica Potrč (b. 1953) - architect and visual artist
Marij Pregelj (1913–1967) - painter and illustrator

R 
Edo Ravnikar (1907–1993) - architect
Rocc (b. 1979) - opera stage director, scenographer, dramaturge and performance artist
Miránda Rúmina (?–) - multimedia, painter, writer

S 
Jakob Savinšek (1922–1961) - sculptor
Maksim Sedej (1909–1974) - painter
Savin Sever (1927–2003) - architect
Matej Sternen (1870–1949) - painter
Christoph Steidl Porenta (1965–) - silversmith

Š 
Henrika Šantel (1874–1940) - painter
Ive Šubic (1922–1989) - painter
Vladimir Šubic (1894–1946) - architect

T 
Jožef Tominc (1790–1866) - painter

U 
Joseph Urbania (1877–1943) - sculptor

V 
Ivan Vurnik (1884–1971) - architect and town planner

See also
List of painters
List of sculptors
list of people by nationality
list of people by occupation

References

 List of Slovenian artists
Artists
Slovenian